The Bornean green magpie (Cissa jefferyi) is a passerine bird in the crow family, Corvidae. It is endemic to montane forests on the southeast Asian island of Borneo. It was formerly included as a subspecies of the Javan green magpie, but under the common name Short-tailed Green Magpie. Uniquely among the green magpies, the Bornean green magpie has whitish eyes (dark reddish-brown in the other species).

It dwells in thick vegetation in the mid and upper storeys of forests, and makes only short flights.

The Bornean green magpie builds an open cup nest of sticks in the canopy. The Bornean green magpie has a rather harsh call; a reminder that they are passerine birds which belong to the crow family Corvidae.

Gallery

References

External links
 Bornean Green Magpie - this is no angry bird – video of nesting Bornean Green Magpie

Cissa (genus)
Endemic birds of Borneo
Birds described in 1888